Miché Mika (born 16 September 1996) is a Congolese professional footballer who plays as a midfielder for TP Mazembe and the DR Congo national football team.

References

1996 births
Living people
Democratic Republic of the Congo footballers
Democratic Republic of the Congo international footballers
Association football midfielders
CS Don Bosco players
TP Mazembe players
Footballers from Kinshasa
2016 African Nations Championship players
Democratic Republic of the Congo A' international footballers
2020 African Nations Championship players
2022 African Nations Championship players